Domagała is a surname of Polish language origin, derived from  the verb domagać (to demand), "the one who demands". Notable people with this surname include:
 Cezary Domagała (born 1961), Polish actor
 Damian Domagała (born 1998), Polish volleyball player
 Jacek Domagała (born 1947), Polish composer
 Jan Domagała (1896–unknown), Polish prisoner
 Łukasz Domagała (born 1987), Polish athlete
 Marian Domagała (1919–1976), Polish lawyer
 Michael Domagala (born 1995), Canadian football player
 Paweł Domagała (born 1984), Polish actor
 Samantha Holmes-Domagala (born 1977), Canadian ice hockey player
 Sebastian Domagała (born 1973), Polish actor
 Steven Domagala (born 1975), Photographer
 Tadeusz Domagała (born 1937), Polish art historian
 Tomasz Domogała (born 1985), Polish businessman
 Waldemar Domagała (1946–2007), Polish architect
 Weronika Domagała (born 1991), Polish tennis player

See also
 

Polish-language surnames